Keyran William Jack Cahill (3 December 1911 – 7 March 1966) was a sportsman who played Australian rules football for Essendon in the Victorian Football League (VFL) during the 1930s and represented Tasmania at first-class cricket.

Cahill, a half back, won two Tasman Shields Trophies while at Northern Tasmanian Football Association club Launceston, in 1933 and 1936. He struggled in his two seasons at Essendon due to a shoulder injury and returned to Launceston in 1939 where he was appointed captain-coach.

He had earlier made four first-class appearances with Tasmania in the 1931–32 season. One of those was against the touring South African team and he took the only wicket of his career when he dismissed all-rounder Quintin McMillan.

See also
 List of Tasmanian representative cricketers

References

CricketArchive: William Cahill
Holmesby, Russell and Main, Jim (2007). The Encyclopedia of AFL Footballers. 7th ed. Melbourne: Bas Publishing.

1911 births
1966 deaths
Essendon Football Club players
Launceston Football Club players
Launceston Football Club coaches
Australian cricketers
Tasmania cricketers
Australian rules footballers from Hobart
Cricketers from Tasmania